The Dartmouth Big Green represented Dartmouth College in ECAC women's ice hockey during the 2015–16 NCAA Division I women's ice hockey season. Their tenth place ECAC finish broke a five-year streak of the Big Green making it to post-season play.

Offseason

August 18:For the third consecutive year, forward Laura Stacey was selected to Team Canada Development Team.  As a member of the team she participated in a three-game series against Team USA in August, 2015, in Lake Placid, New York.

Recruiting

2015–16 Big Green

2015-16 Schedule

|-
!colspan=12 style="  style="background:#00693e; color:white;"| Regular Season

Awards and honors

Laura Stacey, F, All-ECAC Third Team

References

Dartmouth
Dartmouth Big Green women's ice hockey seasons